Johnny Alberto Cecotto Persello (born 25 January 1956), better known as Johnny Cecotto, is a Venezuelan former professional Grand Prix motorcycle racer and auto racer. He rose to prominence as a teenage prodigy in 1975 when he became the youngest motorcycle road racing world champion at the age of 19. Despite the auspicious beginning to his motorcycle racing career, he suffered numerous injuries and mechanical problems which curtailed his success in motorcycle Grand Prix racing.

At the age of 24, Cecotto turned his attention to auto racing where he reached the pinnacle of the sport as a Formula One driver. He later became a successful Touring Car racer. He is the last of a select group of competitors who competed at the highest level in motorcycle and auto racing, which includes John Surtees and Mike Hailwood among others.

Motorcycle racing history

Early career
Cecotto was born in Caracas, Venezuela to Italian immigrant parents. His father was a motorcycle shop owner and former motorcycle racer who had won the Venezuelan national championship on a 500cc Norton. He followed his father's career path and began motorcycle racing at a young age, first competing on a Honda CB750 and a Kawasaki triple before gaining the support of the Venezuelan Yamaha importer. He rode a Yamaha TZ350 to win the 1973 Venezuelan road racing national championship at the age of 17. He successfully defended his title by reclaiming the national championship in 1974, and also won the 1974 South American motorcycle road racing championship.

Daytona success
Cecotto rose to international prominence at the 1975 Daytona 200 motorcycle race with one of the more inspired rides in the history of the event. At the time, the Daytona 200 was considered one of the most prestigious motorcycle races in the world, attracting world champions such as Giacomo Agostini and Barry Sheene. He arrived at Daytona as an unknown rookie aboard an unmodified Yamaha TZ750 sponsored by Venemotos, Yamaha's Venezuelan importer. 

The unheralded teenager promptly raised his profile by qualifying on the front row shared with pole-sitter Kenny Roberts, Gene Romero, Teuvo Lansivuori and Steve Baker. As Cecotto took his place on the starting grid, race officials noticed a puddle of fluid developing beneath his motorcycle. With the start of the race just moments away, the officials made the decision to remove Cecotto and his motorcycle from the grid for safety reasons. As the race was started without Cecotto, officials discovered that the fluid was only water overflowing from the radiator and posed no safety hazard.

Officials allowed Cecotto re-enter the race however, by then he was in last place. With an impressive display of riding ability, Cecotto passed half the field of competitors on the first lap alone. Two laps later, he was up to 26th place. By the fifth lap he was in 18th place and by the end of the tenth lap he was in tenth place. On the 50th lap, he caught and passed Agostini for third place before his motorcycle began to overheat, forcing him to reduce his pace and settle for a third place behind the eventual winner Gene Romero and second place Steve Baker. On the event of the 50th anniversary of the Daytona 200 in 1991, the American Motorcyclist Association convened a panel of motorcycling press and former racers, who named Cecotto's accomplishment as the top performance in the first 50 years of the race.

World champion
One month after his Daytona performance, Cecotto traveled to Europe where he continued his meteoric rise with a victory at the prestigious Imola 200 F750-championship race after Agostini's engine seized while American champion Kenny Roberts withdrew due to a wrist injury.

Cecotto continued his impressive streak by scoring a double victory in the first world championship Grand Prix race of his career. At the season opening French Grand Prix held at the Paul Ricard Circuit, he set the fastest lap time enroute to winning the 250cc race and, followed that performance by leading the 350cc race from start to finish to win by a 25 second margin over the seven-time 350cc world champion Agostini. He had originally planned to compete in two or three European events but, after his performance at the French Grand Prix, he gained full sponsorship for the remainder of the season aboard an ex-Agostini TZ350. He went on to win three more races and defeated Agostini, for the 350cc World Championship. At the age of nineteen, he was the youngest ever world champion until Loris Capirossi won the 1990 125cc world championship at the age of 17. He was competitive in the 250cc world championship with two victories however, a crash at the German Grand Prix and then engine problems for his motorcycle left him in fourth place in the final standings.

Later career

In 1976, Cecotto returned to the Daytona 200, now with full support from the Yamaha factory racing team. The race turned into a battle between Cecotto and his Yamaha teammate, Kenny Roberts. Their grueling pace proved too much for their tires and on the 33rd of the 52 laps Roberts slowed with a worn rear tire. Nine laps from the end, Roberts' tire blew apart, almost making him lose control before he limped back into the pits. Cecotto's pit crew attempted to wave him into the pits with three laps remaining to check on his tire but, he ignored their signal and continued on to win the race. Afterwards, his shredded tires showed how close he was to suffering the same fate as Roberts.

Cecotto moved up to the premier 500cc class riding a year-old Yamaha YZR500 for a Yamaha-supported satellite team operated under the Venemotos team banner. Suzuki's Barry Sheene was expected to be his main competitor for the 1976 world championship. He began the season with a promising second-place finish behind Sheene at the  season-opening French Grand Prix however, Cecotto struggled to come to grips with the Yamaha, falling 13 times in subsequent races. He failed to score any further points after the French round and shortly after the Italian Grand Prix, he gave up on the 500cc class completely to concentrate on defending his 350cc title. He finished the 500cc season in a disappointing 20th place as Sheene won the 500cc world championship. He also lost his 350cc crown in a tight battle with Harley-Davidson mounted Walter Villa.

While Cecotto possessed a natural riding ability, some observers speculated that he had won too early in his career without fully understanding how he had accomplished it. Yamaha Team Manager and former world champion Rod Gould said, "I think Cecotto was going fast and didn't really know why. Now he doesn't know why he's going slower and crashing." Cecotto's results were also affected by the Venemotos team's disorganization and lack of preparation. According to his Yamaha factory mechanic Vince French, on several occasions, the team failed to file official race entry forms or failed to secure garage space thus delaying vital practice time. On other occasions, the team failed to provide equipment required by race organizers causing further delays.

At the beginning of the 1977 season, Cecotto was badly injured in a deadly four rider accident at the Austrian Grand Prix that claimed the life of Swiss rider Hans Stadelmann. He recovered from his injuries in time for the Swedish Grand Prix where he finished in second place, 2.9 seconds behind winner Barry Sheene. Cecotto then won two consecutive races with victories at the Finnish Grand Prix and the Czechoslovak Grand Prix where he also won the 350cc Grand Prix. Despite missing most of the season due to injuries, he still ranked fourth in the final championship standings.

Cecotto began the 1978 season by winning the Imola 200 for a second time but, he faced a new rival for the world championship with the arrival of Kenny Roberts. Although he scored four podium finishes including a narrow victory by 1/10ths of a second over Roberts at the 1978 Dutch TT, he failed to score consistent results and suffered four mechanical failures, as Roberts won the world championship ahead of Sheene and the third placed Cecotto. He was more successful in the 1978 Formula 750 world championship, where despite four victories by Roberts, Cecotto was able to score three victories along with three second-place finishes to secure the championship.

Cecotto suffered a badly broken kneecap at the 1979 Austrian Grand Prix at the Salzburgring and missed half the season due to his injuries. He rejoined the championship for the final four races but, with his injuries still causing him pain, he failed to score consistent results as, Roberts won his second consecutive 500cc world championship. Although he won 5 races in the 1979 Formula 750 world championship, his inconsistent results relegated him to third place in the final standings.

As a result of Roberts' success for the Yamaha team along with Cecotto's inconsistent performances, Yamaha withdrew their factory support for him after the 1979 season. He went into the 1980 season competing as a privateer aboard a Bimota chassis powered by a Yamaha engine in the 350cc class and a production Yamaha in the 500cc class. He began the year with a victory at the 1980 Imola 200, joining Kenny Roberts as three-time winners of the event. His world championship campaign started on a positive note when, he scored a victory at the season opening 350cc French Grand Prix along with a fourth-place finish in the 500cc race however, after his initial success his motorcycles suffered numerous mechanical failures and, he could do no better than a fourth-place finish in the 350cc championship along with a seventh place in the 500cc championship. After the 1980 season, he decided to quit motorcycle racing at the age of 24 to pursue an auto racing career. He retired with twelve 500cc pole positions in 28 starts, giving him one of the highest pole position per start ratios in motorcycle Grand Prix history.

Automobile racing history

Formula racing

Cecotto made his four-wheeled debut with Minardi in the  Formula Two Championship. In the  Formula Two season, driving for the March-BMW team, he won three races and finished the season tied for first place with his teammate Corrado Fabi, but was relegated to runner up by the tie breaker system. Nevertheless, his performance garnered enough attention that he was offered a seat in Formula One.

In Formula One, Cecotto participated in 23 races, debuting on March 13, 1983 for the Theodore Racing team. He had a promising start as he scored a sixth place in only his second race; however, the team suffered from lack of funding and he was forced to sit out the final two rounds. For the 1984 season, he joined the Toleman racing team with Ayrton Senna as his team mate. While qualifying for the British Grand Prix, he crashed heavily, breaking both of his legs which effectively ended his Formula One career. His sixth place at Long Beach stood as the best result for a Venezuelan driver until Pastor Maldonado's victory in the Spanish Grand Prix 29 years later.

Touring cars

After recovering from his injuries, Cecotto returned to competition in the flourishing Group A Touring Car category for the famed Schnitzer Motorsport BMW team, with his best finish being 2nd at the 1985 Spa 24 Hours with Dieter Quester and Markus Oestreich. He then traveled to Australia where he finished second in the 1985 James Hardie 1000 at the Mount Panorama Circuit in Bathurst, driving the BMW 635 CSi he drove at Spa, jointly winning the races "Rookie of the Year" award with his co-driver Roberto Ravaglia. During practice for the James Hardie, Cecotto professed surprise when told by former motorcycle racing rival Gregg Hansford, who was driving an Alfa Romeo GTV6 in the race, that they raced motorcycles at Mt Panorama as well as cars, claiming that he would think twice before racing a bike there (Hansford was at the time the 350cc motorcycle lap record holder for the 6.172 km (3.835 mi) circuit).

In 1986 he joined Belgian based factory backed RAS Sport Volvo team in the renamed (for 1986 only) FIA Touring Car Championship driving a turbocharged Volvo 240T. Usually co-driving with defending European Touring Car Champion Thomas Lindström, Cecotto finished 8th in the championship with two wins (Hockenheim and Zolder), two second and two third placings. He also drove a 240T to victory at the 1986 Guia Race held during the Macau Grand Prix, as well as winning the 1986 InterTEC 500 held at Fuji in Japan alongside Anders Olofsson.

After Volvo pulled out at the end of the 1986 season, Cecotto re-joined BMW and competed in the 1987 World Touring Car Championship driving a BMW M3 for the Italian CiBiEmme team alongside joint 1985 ETCC champion Gianfranco Brancatelli. The pair won the third round of the championship, the 500 km de Bourgogne at Dijon-Prenois, before being the first WTCC registered car to finish the first Australian round, the 1987 James Hardie 1000. Although Cecotto and Brancatelli only finished in 7th place at Bathurst, as the first registered car to finish they were awarded first place points. In 1989 he captured the Italian Touring Car Championship. Cecotto finished in 8th place with Brancatelli in the 1987 World Touring Car Championship with 158 points.

From 1988 to 1992, Cecotto competed in the Deutsche Tourenwagen Meisterschaft (DTM, German Touring Car Championship). Driving a Schnitzer Motorsport BMW M3, he finished as runner up in the 1990 season. He also participated in endurance racing, winning the 1990 24 Hours of Spa and the 1992 24 Hours of Nürburgring. In 1994 and 1998 he won the German Super Tourenwagen Cup Championship for BMW. In 1995 he raced in the British Touring Car Championship (BTCC) for BMW. In 2001 and 2002, he switched to the Irmscher Opel Omega and won the German V8Star Series Championship two years running.

Later life
Cecotto currently devotes most of his time to supporting the professional auto racing career of his sons, Johnny Cecotto Jr. and Jonathan Cecotto.

Racing record

Motorcycle Grand Prix results
Source:

(key) (Races in bold indicate pole position; races in italics indicate fastest lap)

Complete European Formula Two Championship results
Source:
(key) (Races in bold indicate pole position; races in italics indicate fastest lap)

Complete Formula One World Championship results
Source:
(key) (Races in bold indicate pole position)

Complete European Touring Car Championship results
Source:

(key) (Races in bold indicate pole position) (Races in italics indicate fastest lap)

Complete World Touring Car Championship results
Source:
(key) (Races in bold indicate pole position) (Races in italics indicate fastest lap)

† Despite finishing 7th outright at Bathurst, as the highest placed registered WTCC car Cecotto was awarded 1st place points for the round.

Complete Deutsche Tourenwagen Meisterschaft/Masters results
Source:
(key) (Races in bold indicate pole position; races in italics indicate fastest lap)

Complete German GT Cup results
Source:
(key) (Races in bold indicate pole position; races in italics indicate fastest lap)

Complete Super Tourenwagen Cup results
Source:
(key) (Races in bold indicate pole position; races in italics indicate fastest lap)

Complete British Touring Car Championship results
(key) (Races in bold indicate pole position) (Races in italics indicate fastest lap)

24 Hours of Le Mans results
Source:

Complete Bathurst 1000 results

References

External links
 Johnny Cecotto official fan site
 Johnny Cecotto career statistics at MotoGP.com

1956 births
Living people
Venezuelan motorcycle racers
250cc World Championship riders
350cc World Championship riders
500cc World Championship riders
Venezuelan racing drivers
Venezuelan Formula One drivers
Theodore Formula One drivers
Toleman Formula One drivers
European Formula Two Championship drivers
British Touring Car Championship drivers
Deutsche Tourenwagen Masters drivers
24 Hours of Le Mans drivers
World Touring Car Championship drivers
FIA GT Championship drivers
Sportspeople from Caracas
Venezuelan people of Italian descent
World Sportscar Championship drivers
24 Hours of Spa drivers
European Touring Car Championship drivers
Motorsport announcers
BMW M drivers
Schnitzer Motorsport drivers
Oreca drivers
Nürburgring 24 Hours drivers
350cc World Riders' Champions